Red Cedar River may refer to the following streams in the United States:

 Red Cedar River (Michigan), a tributary of the Grand River
 Red Cedar River (Wisconsin), a tributary of the Chippewa River
 Cedar River (Iowa River tributary), also known as Red Cedar River, in Minnesota and Iowa

See also 
 Cedar River (disambiguation)
 Red Cedar (disambiguation)